The Arizona Diamondbacks' 2013 season, was the franchise's 16th season in Major League Baseball and also their 16th season at Chase Field.

The Diamondbacks played 25 extra inning games during the season, the most of any MLB team in 2013.

Regular season

Season standings

National League West

National League Divisional Winners

Record vs. opponents

Game log

|-  style="text-align:center; background: #bfb;"
| 1 || April 1 || Cardinals || 6–2 || Kennedy (1–0) || Wainwright (0–1) || || 48,033 || 1–0
|-  style="text-align:center; background: #fbb;"
| 2 || April 2 || Cardinals || 1–6 || García (1–0) || Cahill (0–1) ||  || 28,387 || 1–1
|-  style="text-align:center; background: #bfb;"
| 3 || April 3 || Cardinals || 10–9 (16)  || Collmenter (1–0) || Salas (0–1) ||  || 26,896 || 2–1
|-  style="text-align:center; background: #bfb;"
| 4 || April 5 || @ Brewers || 3–1 || Miley (1–0) || Badenhop (0–1) || Putz (1) || 24,623 || 3–1
|-  style="text-align:center; background: #bfb;"
| 5 || April 6 || @ Brewers || 9–2 || Corbin (1–0) || Fiers (0–1) ||  || 30,115 || 4–1
|-  style="text-align:center; background: #bfb;"
| 6 || April 7 || @ Brewers || 8–7 (11) || Sipp (1–0) || Axford (0–1) || Bell (1) || 37,733 || 5–1
|-  style="text-align:center; background: #fbb;"
| 7 || April 8 || Pirates || 3–5 || Gómez (1–0) || Cahill (0–1) || Grilli (2) || 21,392 || 5–2
|-  style="text-align:center; background: #fbb;"
| 8 || April 9 || Pirates || 5–6 || McDonald (1–0) || McCarthy (0–1) || Grilli (3) || 19,872 || 5–3
|-  style="text-align:center; background: #bfb;"
| 9 || April 10 || Pirates || 10–2 || Miley (2–0) || Sánchez (0–2) ||  || 17,769 || 6–3
|-  style="text-align:center; background: #bfb;"
| 10 || April 12 || Dodgers || 3–0 || Corbin (2–0) || Kershaw (2–1) || Putz (2) || 29,520 || 7–3
|-  style="text-align:center; background: #fbb;"
| 11 || April 13 || Dodgers || 5–7 || Ryu (2–1) || Kennedy (1–1) || League (4) || 37,214 || 7–4
|-  style="text-align:center; background: #bfb;"
| 12 || April 14 || Dodgers || 1–0 || Putz (1–0) || Beckett (0–2) ||  || 32,313 || 8–4
|-  style="text-align:center; background: #fbb;"
| 13 || April 16 || @ Yankees || 2–4 || Nova (1–1) || McCarthy (0–2) || Rivera (3) || 34,107 || 8–5
|-  style="text-align:center; background: #fbb;"
| 14 || April 17 || @ Yankees || 3–4 || Sabathia (3–1) || Hernandez (0–1) || Rivera (4) || 34,369 || 8–6
|-  style="text-align:center; background: #bfb;"
| 15 || April 18 || @ Yankees || 6–2 (12) || Bell (1–0) || Phelps (0–1) ||  || 36,033 || 9–6
|-  style="text-align:center; background: #fbb;"
| 16 || April 19 || @ Rockies || 1–3 || Chacin (3–0) || Kennedy (1–2) || Betancourt (6) || 23,445 || 9–7
|-  style="text-align:center; background: #fbb;"
| 17 || April 20 || @ Rockies || 3–4 || de la Rosa (2–1) || Cahill (0–3) || Betancourt (7) || 30,380 || 9–8
|-  style="text-align:center; background: #bfb;"
| 18 || April 21 || @ Rockies || 5–4 || Bell (2–0) || López (0–1) || Putz (3) || 42,507 || 10–8
|-  style="text-align:center; background: #fbb;"
| 19 || April 22 || @ Giants || 4–5 || Romo (1–1) || Sipp (2–0) ||  || 41,294 || 10–9
|-  style="text-align:center; background: #bfb;"
| 20 || April 23 || @ Giants || 6–4 (11) || Ziegler (1–0) || Casilla (2–2) || Reynolds (1) || 41,955 || 11–9
|-  style="text-align:center; background: #bfb;"
| 21 || April 24 || @ Giants || 3–2 (10) || Hernandez (1–1) || Gaudin (0–1) || Reynolds (2) || 41,756 || 12–9
|-  style="text-align:center; background: #bfb;"
| 22 || April 25 || Rockies || 3–2 || Cahill (1–3) || de la Rosa (2–2) || Putz (4) || 24,532 || 13–9
|-  style="text-align:center; background: #fbb;"
| 23 || April 26 || Rockies || 3–6 || Nicasio (3–0) || McCarthy (0–3) || Betancourt (8) || 28,801 || 13–10
|-  style="text-align:center; background: #bfb;"
| 24 || April 27 || Rockies || 3–2 (10) || Putz (2–0) || Escalona (1–1) ||  || 31,019 || 14–10
|-  style="text-align:center; background: #bfb;"
| 25 || April 28 || Rockies || 4–2 || Corbin (3–0) || Garland (2–2) || Putz (5) || 24,852 || 15–10
|-  style="text-align:center; background: #fbb;"
| 26 || April 29 || Giants || 4–6 || Machi (1–0) || Ziegler (1–1) || Romo (9) || 18,036 || 15–11
|-  style="text-align:center; background: #fbb;"
| 27 || April 30 || Giants || 1–2 || Rosario (1–0) || Putz (2–1) || Romo (10) || 20,319 || 15–12
|-

|-  style="text-align:center; background: #fbb;"
| 28 || May 1 || Giants || 6–9 || Kontos (2–1) || Hernandez (1–2) || Romo (11) || 21,177 || 15–13
|-  style="text-align:center; background: #fbb;"
| 29 || May 3 || @ Padres || 6–7 || Marquis (3–2) || Miley (2–1) || Street (7) || 31,223 || 15–14
|-  style="text-align:center; background: #bfb;"
| 30 || May 4 || @ Padres || 8–1 || Corbin (4–0) || Richard (0–4) ||  || 31,336 || 16–14
|-  style="text-align:center; background: #fbb;"
| 31 || May 5 || @ Padres || 1–5 || Volquez (3–3) || Kennedy (1–3) ||  || 29,101 || 16–15
|-  style="text-align:center; background: #bfb;"
| 32 || May 6 || @ Dodgers || 9–2 || Cahill (2–3) || Capuano (0–2) ||  || 30,981 || 17–15
|-  style="text-align:center; background: #bfb;"
| 33 || May 7 || @ Dodgers || 5–3 || Hernandez (2–2) || League (0–2) || Bell (2) || 33,611 || 18–15
|-  style="text-align:center; background: #bfb;"
| 34 || May 8 || @ Dodgers || 3–2 || Miley (3–1) || Jansen (1–1) || Bell (3) || 31,512 || 19–15
|-  style="text-align:center; background: #bfb;"
| 35 || May 9 || Phillies || 2–1 || Corbin (5–0) || Hamels (1–5) || Bell (4) || 20,002 || 20–15
|-  style="text-align:center; background: #bfb;"
| 36 || May 10 || Phillies || 3–2 || Sipp (2–1) || Adams (1–3) || Hernandez (1) || 31,900 || 21–15
|-  style="text-align:center; background: #fbb;"
| 37 || May 11 || Phillies || 1–3 || Lee (4–2) || Cahill (2–4) || Papelbon (6) || 28,113 || 21–16
|-  style="text-align:center; background: #fbb;"
| 38 || May 12 || Phillies || 2–4 (10) || De Fratus (1–0) || Reynolds (0–1) || Papelbon (7) || 32,785 || 21–17
|-  style="text-align:center; background: #fbb;"
| 39 || May 13 || Braves || 1–10 || Minor (5–2) || Miley (3–2) ||  || 25,052 || 21–18
|-  style="text-align:center; background: #bfb;"
| 40 || May 14 || Braves || 2–0 || Corbin (6–0) || Teherán (2–1) || Bell (5) || 30,150 || 22–18
|-  style="text-align:center; background: #bfb;"
| 41 || May 15 || Braves || 5–3 || Kennedy (2–3) || Hudson (4–3) || Bell (6) || 23,524 || 23–18
|-  style="text-align:center; background: #bfb;"
| 42 || May 17 || @ Marlins || 9–2 || Cahill (3–4) || Slowey (1–4) ||  || 13,444 || 24–18
|-  style="text-align:center; background: #bfb;"
| 43 || May 18 || @ Marlins || 1–0 || McCarthy (1–3) || Koehler (0–2) ||  || 18,786 || 25–18
|-  style="text-align:center; background: #fbb;"
| 44 || May 19 || @ Marlins || 1–2 || Nolasco (3–5) || Miley (3–3) || Dunn (1) || 20,206 || 25–19
|-  style="text-align:center; background: #bfb;"
| 45 || May 20 || @ Rockies || 5–1 || Corbin (7–0) || Garland (3–5) ||  || 23,053 || 26–19
|-  style="text-align:center; background:#fbb;"
| 46 || May 21 || @ Rockies || 4–5 (10) || López (1–1) || Reynolds (0–2) ||  || 27,096 || 26–20
|-  style="text-align:center; background: #fbb;"
| 47 || May 22 || @ Rockies || 1–4 || de la Rosa (6–3) || Cahill (3–5) || Brothers (1) || 31,763 || 26–21
|-  style="text-align:center; background: #bfb;"
| 48 || May 24 || Padres || 5–2 || McCarthy (2–3) || Eric Stults|Stults (4–4) || Bell (7) || 24,043 || 27–21
|-  style="text-align:center; background: #fbb;"
| 49 || May 25 || Padres || 4–10 || Cashner (4–2) || Miley (3–4) ||  || 26,628 || 27–22
|-  style="text-align:center; background: #bfb;"
| 50 || May 26 || Padres || 6–5 || Corbin (8–0) || Layne (0–1) || Bell (8) || 27,639 || 28–22
|-  style="text-align:center; background: #bfb;"
| 51 || May 27 || Rangers || 5–3 || Skaggs (1–0) || Perez (0–1) || Bell (9) || 30,638 || 29–22
|-  style="text-align:center; background: #bfb;"
| 52 || May 27 || Rangers || 5–4 || Ziegler (2–1) || Frasor (0–1) ||  || 23,622 || 30–22
|-  style="text-align:center; background: #bbb;"
| - || May 29 || @ Rangers || colspan=6|Postponed (rain) Rescheduled for August 1
|-  style="text-align:center; background: #fbb;"
| 53 || May 30 || @ Rangers || 5–9 || Grimm (5–3) || McCarthy (2–4) ||  || 30,896 || 30–23
|-  style="text-align:center; background: #fbb;"
| 54 || May 31 || @ Cubs || 2–7 || Garza (1–0) || Miley (3–5) ||  || 24,645 || 30–24
|-

|-  style="text-align:center; background: #bfb;"
| 55 || June 1 || @ Cubs || 12–4 || Kennedy (3–3) || Mármol (2–3) ||  || 31,465 || 31–24
|-  style="text-align:center; background: #bfb;"
| 56 || June 2 || @ Cubs || 8–4 || Corbin (9–0) || Jackson (1–8) ||  || 29,667 || 32–24
|-  style="text-align:center; background: #fbb;"
| 57 || June 3 || @ Cardinals || 1–7 || Lynn (8–1) || Cahill (3–6) ||  || 38,042 ||32–25
|-  style="text-align:center; background: #bfb;"
| 58 || June 4 || @ Cardinals || 7–6 (14)|| Collmenter (2–0) || Marte (0–1) || Bell (10) || 39,222 || 33–25
|-  style="text-align:center; background: #bfb;"
| 59 || June 5 || @ Cardinals || 10–3 || Miley (4–5) || Kelly (0–3) ||  || 40,792 || 34–25
|-  style="text-align:center; background: #fbb;"
| 60 || June 6 || @ Cardinals || 8–12 || Miller (7–3) || Kennedy (3–4) || Mujica (18) || 43,798 || 34–26
|-  style="text-align:center; background: #bfb;"
| 61 || June 7 || Giants || 3–1 || Ziegler (3–1) || Affeldt (1–2) || Bell (11) || 37,542 || 35–26
|-  style="text-align:center; background: #fbb;"
| 62 || June 8 || Giants || 5–10 || Bumgarner (5–4) || Cahill (3–7) ||  || 44,574 || 35–27
|-  style="text-align:center; background: #fbb;"
| 63 || June 9 || Giants || 2–6 || Gaudin (2–1) || Skaggs (1–1) ||  || 38,222 || 35–28
|-  style="text-align:center; background: #bfb;"
| 64 || June 10 || @ Dodgers || 5–4 || Sipp (3–1) || League (2–3) || Bell (12) || 38,275 || 36–28
|-  style="text-align:center; background: #fbb;"
| 65 || June 11 || @ Dodgers || 3–5 || Guerrier (2–2) || Hernandez (2–3) || Jansen (3) || 42,844 || 36–29
|-  style="text-align:center; background: #bfb;"
| 66 || June 12 || @ Dodgers || 8–6 (12) || Collmenter (3–0) || Belisario (3–5) ||  || 41,927 || 37–29
|-  style="text-align:center; background: #fbb;"
| 67 || June 14 || @ Padres || 1–2 || Stults (2–5) || Cahill (3–8) ||  || 23,364 || 37–30
|-  style="text-align:center; background: #fbb;"
| 68 || June 15 || @ Padres || 4–6 || Marquis (9–2) || Miley (4–6) || Street (12) || 29,756 || 37–31
|-  style="text-align:center; background: #fbb;"
| 69 || June 16 || @ Padres || 1–4 || Richard (2–5) || Hernandez (2–4) || Street (13) || 27,943 || 37–32
|-  style="text-align:center; background: #fbb;"
| 70 || June 17 || Marlins || 2–3 || Dunn (2–1) || Bell (2–1) || Cishek (10) || 19,354 || 37–33
|-  style="text-align:center; background: #bfb;"
| 71 || June 18 || Marlins || 3–2 || Hernandez (3–4) || Qualls (2–1) ||  || 21,067 || 38–33
|-  style="text-align:center; background: #bfb;"
| 72 || June 19 || Marlins || 3–1 || Hernandez (4–4) || Fernández (4–4) || Bell (13) || 26,867 || 39–33
|-  style="text-align:center; background: #bfb;"
| 73 || June 21 || Reds || 11–5 || Harris (1–0) || Cueto (4–1) ||  || 27,819 || 40–33
|-  style="text-align:center; background: #bfb;"
| 74 || June 22 || Reds || 4–3 || Ziegler (4–1) || Chapman (3–3) ||  || 30,567 || 41–33
|-  style="text-align:center; background: #fbb;"
| 75 || June 23 || Reds || 2–4 || Latos (7–1) || Delgado (0–1) || Chapman (19) || 30,723 || 41–34
|-  style="text-align:center; background: #fbb;"
| 76 || June 25 || @ Nationals || 5–7 || Gonzalez (4–3) || Cahill (3–9) || Soriano (20) || 30,287 || 41–35
|-  style="text-align:center; background: #fbb;"
| 77 || June 26 || @ Nationals || 2–3 || Zimmermann (11–3) || Miley (4–7) || Soriano (21) || 31,172 || 41–36
|-  style="text-align:center; background: #bfb;"
| 78 || June 27 || @ Nationals || 3–2 (11) || Collmenter (4–0) || Stammen (4–3) || Bell (14) || 32,948 || 42–36
|-  style="text-align:center; background: #fbb;"
| 79 || June 28 || @ Braves || 0–3 || Teherán (6–4) || Delgado (0–2) || Kimbrel (23) || 48,282 || 42–37
|-  style="text-align:center; background: #fbb;"
| 80 || June 29 || @ Braves || 5–11 || Walden (3–1) || Hernandez (4–5) ||  || 39,180 || 42–38
|-  style="text-align:center; background: #fbb;"
| 81 || June 30 || @ Braves || 2–6 || Maholm (9–6) || Cahill (3–10) ||  || 34,574 || 42–39
|-

|-  style="text-align:center; background: #fbb;"
| 82 || July 1 || @ Mets || 4–5 (13) || Aardsma (1–0) || Collmenter (4–1) ||  || 22,240 || 42–40
|-  style="text-align:center; background: #fbb;"
| 83 || July 2 || @ Mets || 1–9 || Hefner (3–6) || Corbin (9–1) ||  || 21,500 || 42–41
|-  style="text-align:center; background: #bfb;"
| 84 || July 3 || @ Mets || 5–3 || Delgado (1–2) || Harvey (7–2) || Bell (15) || 41,257 || 43–41
|-  style="text-align:center; background: #bfb;"
| 85 || July 4 || @ Mets || 5–4 (15) || Roe (1–0) || Rice (3–5) || Ziegler (1) || 24,224 || 44–41
|-  style="text-align:center; background: #bfb;"
| 86 || July 5 || Rockies || 5–0 || Skaggs (2–1) || de la Rosa (8–5) ||  || 45,505 || 45–41
|-  style="text-align:center; background: #bfb;"
| 87 || July 6 || Rockies || 11–1 || Miley (5–7) || Pomeranz (0–2) ||  || 22,395 || 46–41
|-  style="text-align:center; background: #bfb;"
| 88 || July 7 || Rockies || 6–1 || Corbin (10–1) || Oswalt (0–4) ||  || 22,090 || 47–41
|-  style="text-align:center; background: #fbb;"
| 89 || July 8 || Dodgers || 1–6 || Greinke (7–2) || Delgado (1–3) ||  || 22,614 || 47–42
|-  style="text-align:center; background: #fbb;"
| 90 || July 9 || Dodgers || 1–6 || Nolasco (6–8) || Kennedy (3–5) ||  || 23,409 || 47–43
|-  style="text-align:center; background: #fbb;"
| 91 || July 10 || Dodgers || 5–7 (14) || Jansen (3–3) || Collmenter (4–2) ||  || 24,466 || 47–44
|-  style="text-align:center; background: #bfb;"
| 92 || July 11 || Brewers || 5–3 || Miley (6–7) || Henderson (3–3) || Ziegler (2) || 17,531 || 48–44
|-  style="text-align:center; background: #bfb;"
| 93 || July 12 || Brewers || 2–1 || Corbin (11–1) || Gorzelanny (1–3) || Hernandez (2) || 19,681 || 49–44
|-  style="text-align:center; background: #bfb;"
| 94 || July 13 || Brewers || 5–4 || Harris (2–0) || Lohse (5–7) || Ziegler (3) || 33,566 || 50–44
|-  style="text-align:center; background: #fbb;"
| 95 || July 14 || Brewers || 1–5 || Peralta (7–9) || Kennedy (3–6) ||  || 25,057 || 50–45
|-  style="text-align:center; background: #fbb;"
| 96 || July 19 || @ Giants || 0–2 || Gaudin (4–1) || Kennedy (3–7) || Romo (22) || 41,924 || 50–46
|-  style="text-align:center; background: #fbb;"
| 97 || July 20 || @ Giants || 3–4 || Cain (6–6) || Miley (6–8) || Romo (23) || 41,742 || 50–47
|-  style="text-align:center; background: #bfb;"
| 98 || July 21 || @ Giants || 3–1 || Delgado (2–3) || Bumgarner (10–6) || Ziegler (4) || 41,949 || 51–47
|-  style="text-align:center; background: #fbb;"
| 99 || July 22 || Cubs || 2–4 || Rusin (1–0) || Skaggs (2–2) || Gregg (19) || 21,288 || 51–48
|-  style="text-align:center; background: #bfb;"
| 100 || July 23 || Cubs || 10–4 || Corbin (12–1) || Wood (6–7) ||  || 21,278 || 52–48
|-  style="text-align:center; background: #fbb;"
| 101 || July 24 || Cubs || 6–7 (12) || Rondon (2–0) || Hernandez (4–6) ||  || 21,141 || 52–49
|-  style="text-align:center; background: #bfb;"
| 102 || July 25 || Cubs || 3–1 || Miley (7–8) || Villanueva (2–7) || Ziegler (5) || 23,341 || 53–49
|-  style="text-align:center; background: #bfb;"
| 103 || July 26 || Padres || 10–0 || Delgado (3–3) || Stults (8–9) ||  || 22,249 || 54–49
|-  style="text-align:center; background: #fbb;"
| 104 || July 27 || Padres || 3–12 || Cashner (7–5) || Skaggs (2–3) ||  || 30,033 || 54–50
|-  style="text-align:center; background: #fbb;"
| 105 || July 28 || Padres || 0–1 || Ross (2–4) || Corbin (12–2) || Street (19) || 24,864 || 54–51
|-  style="text-align:center; background: #fbb;"
| 106 || July 30 || @ Rays || 2–5 || Hernández (6–11) || Kennedy (3–8) ||  || 17,402 || 54–52
|-  style="text-align:center; background: #bfb;"
| 107 || July 31 || @ Rays || 7–0 || Miley (8–8) || Hellickson (10–4) ||  || 25,095 || 55–52
|-

|-  style="text-align:center; background: #fbb;"
| 108  || August 1 || @ Rangers || 1–7 || Darvish (10–5) || Spruill (0–1) ||  || 41,569 || 55–53
|-  style="text-align:center; background: #bfb;"
| 109 || August 2 || @ Red Sox || 7–6 || Delgado (4–3) || Beato (1–1) || Ziegler (6) || 37,652 ||56–53
|-  style="text-align:center; background: #fbb;"
| 110 || August 3 || @ Red Sox || 2–5 || Peavy (9–4) || Corbin (12–3) || Uehara (10) || 37,941 || 56–54
|-  style="text-align:center; background: #fbb;"
| 111 || August 4 || @ Red Sox || 0–4 || Doubront (8–5) || McCarthy (2–5) ||  || 37,611 || 56–55
|-  style="text-align:center; background: #bfb;"
| 112 || August 6 || Rays || 6–1 || Miley (9–8) || Hellickson (10–5) ||  || 19,458 || 57–55
|-  style="text-align:center; background:#bfb;"
| 113 || August 7 || Rays || 9–8 || Putz (3–1) || Peralta (1–5) || Ziegler (7) || 18,733 || 58–55
|-  style="text-align:center; background: #bfb;"
| 114 || August 9 || Mets || 5–4 || Ziegler (5–1) || Atchison (2–1) ||  || 25,187 || 59–55
|-  style="text-align:center; background:#fbb;"
| 115 || August 10 || Mets || 1–4 || Wheeler (5–2) || McCarthy (2–6) || Hawkins (3) || 42,450 || 59–56
|-  style="text-align:center; background: #fbb;"
| 116 || August 11 || Mets || 5–9 || Niese (4–6) || Spruill (0–2) ||  || 28,260 || 59–57
|-  style="text-align:center; background:#bfb;"
| 117 || August 12 || Orioles || 7–6 || Ziegler (6–1) || O'Day (5–2) ||  || 18,889 || 60–57
|-  style="text-align:center; background: #bfb;"
| 118 || August 13 || Orioles || 4–3 (11) || Bell (3–1) || McFarland (1–1) ||  || 20,036 || 61–57
|-  style="text-align:center; background: #bfb;"
| 119 || August 14 || Orioles || 5–4 (14) || Bell (4–1) || Norris (8–10) ||  || 19,568 || 62–57
|-  style="text-align:center; background: #fbb;"
| 120 || August 16 || @ Pirates || 2–6 || Cole (6–5) || McCarthy (2–7) ||  || 39,091 || 62–58
|-  style="text-align:center; background: #bfb;"
| 121 || August 17 || @ Pirates || 15–5 || Cahill (4–10) || Locke (9–4) ||  || 37,982 || 63–58
|-  style="text-align:center; background: #bfb;"
| 122 || August 18 || @ Pirates || 4–2 (16) || Ziegler (7–1) || Johnson (0–1) || Putz (6) || 37,518 || 64–58
|-  style="text-align:center; background: #fbb;"
| 123 || August 19 || @ Reds || 3–5 || Arroyo (12–9) || Delgado (4–4) || Chapman (31) || 20,349 || 64–59
|-  style="text-align:center; background: #bfb;"
| 124 || August 20 || @ Reds || 5–2 || Corbin (13–3) || Cingrani (6–3) ||  || 20,092 || 65–59
|-  style="text-align:center; background: #fbb;"
| 125 || August 21 || @ Reds || 7–10 || Leake (11–5) || McCarthy (2–8) || Chapman (32) || 23,297 || 65–60
|-  style="text-align:center; background: #fbb;"
| 126 || August 22 || @ Reds || 1–2 || Latos (13–4) || De La Rosa (0–1) || LeCure (1) || 21,166 || 65–61
|-  style="text-align:center; background: #fbb;"
| 127 || August 23 || @ Phillies || 3–4 || Papelbon (4–1) || Bell (4–2) ||  || 32,619 || 65–62
|-  style="text-align:center; background: #bfb;"
| 128 || August 24 || @ Phillies || 12–7 (18) || Cahill (5–10) || Wells (0–1) ||  || 34,637 || 66–62
|-  style="text-align:center; background: #fbb;"
| 129 || August 25 || @ Phillies || 5–9 || Halladay (3–4) || Corbin (13–4) ||  || 36,128 || 66–63
|-  style="text-align:center; background: #bfb;"
| 130 || August 26 || Padres || 6–1 || McCarthy (3–8) || Ross (3–7) ||  || 16,871 || 67–63
|-  style="text-align:center; background: #bfb;"
| 131 || August 27 || Padres || 10–9 (10) || Bell (5–2) || Thayer (2–4) ||  || 19,807 || 68–63
|-  style="text-align:center; background: #fbb;"
| 132 || August 28 || Padres || 1–5 || Erlin (2–2) || Miley (9–9) ||  || 20,578 || 68–64
|-  style="text-align:center; background: #fbb;"
| 133 || August 30 || Giants || 0–1 || Lincecum (8–13) || Delgado (4–5) || Romo (33) || 24,380 || 68–65
|-  style="text-align:center; background: #bfb;"
| 134 || August 31 || Giants || 4–3 || Ziegler (8–1) || Rosario (3–2) ||  || 36,091 || 69–65
|-

|-  style="text-align:center; background: #fbb;"
| 135 || September 1 || Giants || 2–8 || Petit (2–0) || Corbin (13–5) ||  || 33,422 || 69–66
|-  style="text-align:center; background: #fbb;"
| 136 || September 2 || Blue Jays || 1–4 || Rogers (4–7) || McCarthy (3–9) || Janssen (27) || 21,014 || 69–67
|-  style="text-align:center; background: #fbb;"
| 137 || September 3 || Blue Jays || 4–10 || Redmond (3–2) || Miley (9-10) ||  || 19,100 || 69–68
|-  style="text-align:center; background: #bfb;"
| 138 || September 4 || Blue Jays || 4–3 (10) || Harris (3–0) || Pérez (0-1) ||  || 16,154 || 70–68
|-  style="text-align:center; background: #bfb;"
| 139 || September 5 || @ Giants || 4–2 || Cahill (6-10) || Vogelsong (3–5) || Ziegler (8) || 41,193 || 71–68
|-  style="text-align:center; background: #fbb;"
| 140 || September 6 || @ Giants || 0–3 || Petit (3–0) || Corbin (13–6) ||  || 41,180 || 71–69
|-  style="text-align:center; background: #bfb;"
| 141 || September 7 || @ Giants || 2–1 || McCarthy (4–9) || Cain (8–9) || Ziegler (9) || 41,076 || 72–69
|-  style="text-align:center; background: #fbb;"
| 142 || September 8 || @ Giants || 2–3 (11) || López (3–2) || Thatcher (3–2) ||  || 41,050 || 72–70
|-  style="text-align:center; background: #fbb;"
| 143 || September 9 || @ Dodgers || 1–8 || Nolasco (13–9) || Delgado (4–6) ||  || 52,410 || 72–71
|-  style="text-align:center; background: #fbb;"
| 144 || September 10 || @ Dodgers || 3–5 (11) || Withrow (3–0) || Collmenter (4–3) ||  || 41,867 || 72–72
|-  style="text-align:center; background: #bfb;"
| 145 || September 11 || @ Dodgers || 4–1 || Corbin (14–6) || Ryu (13–6) || Ziegler (10) || 40,818 || 73–72
|-  style="text-align:center; background: #fbb;"
| 146 || September 13 || Rockies || 5–7 || Outman (3–0) || Harris (3-1) || Brothers (17) || 31,713 || 73–73
|-  style="text-align:center; background: #bfb;"
| 147 || September 14 || Rockies || 9–2 || Miley (10-10) || Oswalt (0–6) ||  || 32,237 || 74–73
|-  style="text-align:center; background: #bfb;"
| 148 || September 15 || Rockies || 8–2 || Delgado (5–6) || Chacín (13–9) ||  || 26,845 || 75–73
|-  style="text-align:center; background: #bfb;"
| 149 || September 16 || Dodgers || 2-1 || Cahill (7-10) || Ryu (13–7) || Ziegler (11) || 24,933  || 76–73
|-  style="text-align:center; background: #fbb;"
| 150 || September 17 || Dodgers || 3–9 || Greinke (15–3) || Corbin (14–7) ||  || 26,304 || 76–74
|-  style="text-align:center; background: #bfb;"
| 151 || September 18 || Dodgers || 9–4 || McCarthy (5–9) || Fife (4–4) ||  || 27,305 || 77–74
|-  style="text-align:center; background: #fbb;"
| 152 || September 19 || Dodgers || 6–7 || Howell (3-1) || Collmenter (4–4) || Jansen (26) || 22,763 || 77–75
|-  style="text-align:center; background: #fbb;"
| 153 || September 20 || @ Rockies || 4–9 || Chacín (14–9) || Sipp (3–2)  ||  || 38,247 || 77–76
|-  style="text-align:center; background: #bfb;"
| 154 || September 21 || @ Rockies || 7–2 || Cahill (8-10) || McHugh (0–3) ||  || 36,005  || 78–76
|-  style="text-align:center; background: #bfb;"
| 155 || September 22 || @ Rockies || 13–9 || Harris (4-1) || Nicasio (8–9) ||  || 43,736 || 79–76
|-  style="text-align:center; background: #fbb;"
| 156 || September 23 || @ Padres || 1–4 || Stults (10-13) || McCarthy (5-10) || Street (33) || 15,869 || 79–77
|-  style="text-align:center; background: #bfb;"
| 157 || September 24 || @ Padres || 2-1 (12) || Collmenter (5–4) || Gregerson (6–8) || Ziegler (12) || 18,562 || 80–77
|-  style="text-align:center; background: #fbb;"
| 158 || September 25 || @ Padres || 2-12 || Kennedy (7-10) || Delgado (5–7) ||  || 29,528 || 80–78
|-  style="text-align:center; background: #fbb;"
| 159 || September 26 || @ Padres || 2–3 (11) || Vincent (6–3) || Collmenter (5–5) ||  || 21,393 || 80–79
|-  style="text-align:center; background: #fbb;"
| 160 || September 27 || Nationals || 4–8 || Strasburg (8–9) || Corbin (14–8) ||  || 31,037 || 80–80
|-  style="text-align:center; background: #fbb;"
| 161 || September 28 || Nationals || 0–2 || Haren (10-14) || McCarthy (5-11) || Soriano (43) || 29,673 || 80–81
|-  style="text-align:center; background: #bfb;"
| 162 || September 29 || Nationals || 3–2 || Hernandez (5–6) || Mattheus (0–2) || Ziegler (13) || 30,420 || 81–81
|-

Roster

Opening day lineup

Player stats
Note: Team leaders in batting and pitching categories are in bold.

Batting
Note: G = Games played; AB = At bats; R = Runs scored; H = Hits; 2B = Doubles; 3B = Triples; HR = Home runs; RBI = Runs batted in; AVG = Batting average; SB = Stolen bases

Pitching
Note: W = Wins; L = Losses; ERA = Earned run average; G = Games pitched; GS = Games started; SV = Saves; IP = Innings pitched; H = Hits allowed; R = Runs allowed; ER = Earned runs allowed; BB = Walks allowed; K = Strikeouts

Farm system

References

External links

 2013 Arizona Diamondbacks season at Baseball Reference
 2013 Arizona Diamondbacks season Official Site

Arizona Diamondbacks season
Arizona Diamondbacks
Arizona Diamondbacks seasons